Chhabra Thermal Power Plant is one of Rajasthan's coal fired power plants. It is located at Chowki Motipura (Village) of tehsil Chhabra in Rajasthan's Baran district. The planned capacity of power plant is 3640 MW.

Installed capacity

See also 

 Suratgarh Super Thermal Power Plant
 Giral Lignite Power Plant
 Kota Super Thermal Power Plant

References

External links
 Chhabra Thermal Power Station at SourceWatch

Coal-fired power stations in Rajasthan
2010 establishments in Rajasthan
Energy infrastructure completed in 2010
Baran district